The Northrop M2-F3 was a heavyweight lifting body rebuilt from the Northrop M2-F2 after it crashed at the Dryden Flight Research Center in 1967. It was modified with an additional third vertical fin - centered between the tip fins - to improve control characteristics. The "M" refers to "manned" and "F" refers to "flight" version.

Development
Early flight testing of the M2-F1 and M2-F2 lifting body reentry configurations had validated the concept of piloted lifting body reentry from space. When the M2-F2 crashed on May 10, 1967, valuable information had already been obtained and was contributing to new designs.

NASA pilots said the M2-F2 had lateral control problems, so when the M2-F2 was rebuilt at Northrop and redesignated the M2-F3, it was modified with an additional third vertical fin - centered between the tip fins - to improve control characteristics.

After a three-year-long redesign and rebuilding effort, the M2-F3 was ready to fly. The May 1967 crash of the M2-F2 had torn off the left fin and landing gear. It had also damaged the external skin and internal structure. Flight Research Center engineers worked with Ames Research Center and the Air Force in redesigning the vehicle with a center fin to provide greater stability. At first, it seemed that the vehicle had been irreparably damaged, but the original manufacturer, Northrop, did the repair work and returned the redesigned M2-F3 with a center fin for stability to the FRC.

While the M2-F3 was still demanding to fly, the center fin eliminated the high risk of pilot-induced oscillation (PIO) that was characteristic of the M2-F2.

Operational history
First flight of the M2-F3, with NASA pilot Bill Dana at the controls, was June 2, 1970. The modified vehicle exhibited much better lateral stability and control characteristics than before, and only three glide flights were necessary before the first powered flight on November 25, 1970. The 100th flight of the heavy-weight lifting bodies was completed on October 5, 1972, with pilot Bill Dana soaring to an altitude of 66,300 feet (20,200 m) and a Mach number of 1.370 (about ) in the M2-F3. Highest altitude reached by the vehicle was 71,500 feet (20,790 m) on December 20, 1972, the date of its last flight, with NASA pilot John Manke at the controls.

A reaction control thruster (RCT) system, similar to that on orbiting spacecraft, was also installed to obtain research data about their effectiveness for vehicle control. As the M2-F3's portion of the lifting body program neared an end, it evaluated a rate command augmentation control system, and a side control stick similar to side-stick controllers now used on many modern aircraft.

NASA donated the M2-F3 vehicle to the Smithsonian Institution in December 1973. It is currently hanging in the National Air and Space Museum along with the X-15 aircraft number 1, which was its hangar partner at Dryden from 1965 to 1969.

M2-F3 pilots
William H. Dana - 19 flights
John A. Manke - 4 flights
Cecil W. Powell - 3 flights
Jerauld R. Gentry - 1 flight
Most of text taken from NASA Dryden webpage.

Aircraft serial number
NASA M2-F3 - NASA 803, 27 flights

M2-F3 flights

Specifications (M2-F3)

Gallery

See also
Comparable aircraft:
X-24 
M2-F1 
M2-F2 
HL-10

External links

 NASA Dryden M2-F3 Photo Collection
Wingless Flight: The Lifting Body Story. NASA History Series SP-4220 1997 PDF

Lifting bodies
M2-F3
M2-F3, Northrop
M2-F3, Northrop
M2-F3